Filippos Skopelitis (born 26 August 1994) is a Greek professional footballer who plays as an attacking midfielder for Super League 2 club Olympiacos Volos.

References

1994 births
Living people
Greek footballers
Super League Greece 2 players
Football League (Greece) players
Gamma Ethniki players
Olympiacos Volos F.C. players
Niki Volos F.C. players
Association football midfielders